"Heart Healer" is a song written by John Greenebaum and Tomas Gmeiner, and recorded by American country music artist Mel Tillis.  It was released in December 1976 as the first single and title track from the album Heart Healer.  The song was Tillis' third number one on the country chart.  The single stayed at number one for one week and spent a total of nine weeks on the country chart.

Producer Companies 

 Manufactured By – MCA Records, Inc.
 Produced For – Mel Tillis Productions, Inc.
 Phonographic Copyright (p) – MCA Records, Inc.
 Copyright (c) – MCA Records, Inc.

Charts

Weekly charts

Year-end charts

References

1976 singles
1976 songs
Mel Tillis songs
Song recordings produced by Jimmy Bowen
MCA Records singles
Songs written by John Greenebaum